Rainer Buchmann is a German car designer, who founded the "bb" company specialised in the modification of luxury cars.

Life and career 
Rainer Buchmann founded the bb company in Frankfurt in 1974, when he converted a Porsche 911 Coupé into a Porsche Targa and painted it with the rainbow colours of Polaroid. The car was exhibited for Polaroid at the photokina fair in 1976. Buchmann produced a number of unusual modifications of Porsche and Mercedes-Benz cars for international clients.   

Buchmann employed the former Porsche employee Eberhard Schulz in 1978 and built together with him the bb Mercedes-Benz CW 311 in Frankfurt, which was permitted to bear the Mercedes star. Both the Turbo Targa and the CW 311 had their debut in the 1980 German movie Car napping. Later cars included the bb Flatnose Porsche, the bb Magic Top Mercedes-Benz, the bb Volkswagen Polo Paris/Carat and a conversion of one of the last Mercedes-Benz 600 Pullman with free standing wing arches in 1930s style. Buchmann became partner of well known German companies including car and paint manufacturers. 

Buchmann saw himself as a car couturier, because his designs were further advanced than those of commercial car tuning companies. He excelled also by technical his developments. Beside his car body modifications he was a pioneer for leading edge automotive electronics, which is today common in many mass produced cars: a remote control for the central locking system, infrared sensors as park assistants, digital computer systems and the multi function steering wheel, for which he filed a patent, and the speaking cockpit.

His turnover declined in the 1980s as in the worldwide aftermarket tuning sector. The deteriorating dollar exchange rate affected his exports to the United States and Near East, so that he closed his business in 1986. Subsequently, he worked as a self employed consultant. 

Buchmann started a comeback in Frankfurt in 2014. He presented the bb Moonracer, a new interpretation of the Turbo Targa Rainbow Porsche of 1976 based on a 1980s Porsche Targa. Parallel to this a book about bb was published by Heel, which was written by Dr. Gerold Lingnau the retired editor of the technology and motor section of the Frankfurter Allgemeine Zeitung. The book reviews under the title "bb Rainer Buchmann: Innovation-Design-Emotion" the achievements of the car couturier.

Gallery

Patents 
 Electric steering device for vehicles. EP 0153434 A1.

References

External links 

 

Year of birth missing (living people)
Living people
German automobile designers
20th-century German inventors
Businesspeople from Frankfurt